The "Mother Teresa" Decoration is an honorary decoration of the Republic of Albania given to Albanian and foreign citizens for outstanding acts of humanity towards the Albanian nation and the world. The decoration is given by the President of Albania. The proposer could be the President or institutions of authority (Prime Minister, Assembly, Ministries, independent bodies, etc.). The Mother Teresa award is considered the highest award in Albania.

in March 2019, Albania President Ilir Meta presented the High Decoration “Mother Teresa” to Mary Jean Eisenhower of Abilene and the organization People to People International on Monday.

President Meta presented the decoration in gratitude for the precious and continuous contribution to the promotion and presentation of Albania in the United States and as a leader of People to People, the Albania Daily News reported.

Recipients
 University Medical Center of Tirana "Mother Teresa"
 Vincenzo Paglia
 Albanian Caritas, OJQ
 Pjetër Arbnori
 Valdas Adamkus
 Stjepan Mesić
Mary Jean Eisenhower
Theodore Roosevelt Britton

See also
Orders, decorations and medals of Albania

References

Decoration
Awards established in 1996
1996 establishments in Albania